The Cultural and Ideological Revolution or Cultural Revolution was a period of political and social change in Albania, launched by Enver Hoxha, the First Secretary of the Party of Labour of Albania (PPSH) at the time. The authorities of the People's Socialist Republic of Albania chose to echo the Cultural Revolution in China, and were inspired by its effects. It originated through a speech held on February 6, 1967 aiming at radical changes in the military (known as the Albanian People's Army), bureaucracy and religious life. During the Cultural and Ideological Revolution, traditional kinship links in Albania, which were centered on the patriarchal family, were shaken by the postwar repression of clan leaders, collectivization of agriculture, industrialization, migration from the countryside to urban areas, and suppression of religion.  It also encouraged communist students and workers to use more forceful tactics to discourage religious practices, although violence was initially condemned.

Background 
In the mid-1960s, Albania's leaders grew wary of a threat to their power by a burgeoning bureaucracy. Party discipline had eroded. People complained about malfeasance, inflation, and low-quality goods. Writers strayed from the orthodoxy of socialist realism, which demanded that art and literature serve as instruments of government and party policy. As a result, after Mao Zedong unleashed the Cultural Revolution in China in 1966, Hoxha launched his own Cultural and Ideological Revolution.

Impact on the Albanian system 
Railing against a "white-collar mentality," the authorities also slashed the salaries of mid- and high-level officials, ousted administrators and specialists from their desk jobs, and sent such persons to toil in the factories and fields. Six ministries, including the Ministry of Justice, were eliminated. Farm collectivization even spread to the remote mountains. In addition, the government attacked dissident writers and artists, reformed its educational system, and generally reinforced Albania's isolation from European culture in an effort to keep out foreign influences.

Albanian People's Army
The regime abolished military ranks, reintroduced political commissars into the military, and renounced professionalism in the Albanian People's Army. The idea for the abolition of ranks in the army was put forward in April 1966, with the Open Letter that the Political Bureau of the Central Committee of the PPSH sent to communist organizations. The open letter provided arguments as to why this reform should take place and, among the main ones were the lack of ranks in the Albanian Liberation Army. When the Chinese in the 1980s restored the ranks, the Albanian army did not introduce them, with Enver Hoxha describing them as: "Generals with lousy breasts from decorations".

Impact on women 
The postwar regime brought a radical change in the status of Albania's women. Considered second-class citizens in traditional Albanian society, women did most of the work at home and they also did most of the work in the fields. Before World War II, about 90% of Albania's women were illiterate, and in many areas, they were regarded as chattel under ancient tribal laws and customs. During the Cultural and Ideological Revolution, the party encouraged women to take jobs outside the home in an effort to compensate for labor shortages and overcome their conservatism.

Impact on religion 
During the revolution, the Party began to promote secularism in place of Abrahamic religions, namely Islam. After the 5th Congress of the Party of Labor of Albania and Enver Hoxha's speech on 6 February 1967, the authorities launched a violent campaign to extinguish religious life in Albania, claiming that religion had divided the Albanian nation and kept it mired in backwardness. Student agitators combed the countryside, forcing Albanians to quit practicing their faiths. Despite complaints, even by APL members, all churches, mosques, monasteries, and other religious institutions were closed or converted into warehouses, gymnasiums, and workshops by year's end. A special decree abrogated the charters by which the country's main religious communities had operated. The campaign culminated in an announcement that Albania had become the world's first atheistic state, a feat which was trumpeted as one of Enver Hoxha's greatest achievements. While the Albanian Constitution had formally guaranteed freedom of religion to the Albanian people right up until that time, religious freedom was virtually non-existent after 1967.

Legacy 
In 2019, journalist Luljeta Progni in collaboration with the "Kujto" Foundation, as part of a series of documentaries with human history on the crimes of communism, aired on News24 television the documentary "Stones of Faith" that deals with the Cultural Revolution.

See also 

 List of cultural, intellectual, philosophical and technological revolutions
 Cultural Revolution in the Soviet Union
Hoxhaism

References

1960s in Albania
People's Socialist Republic of Albania
Enver Hoxha
Political and cultural purges